The 2020 SummerSlam was the 33rd annual SummerSlam professional wrestling pay-per-view (PPV) and livestreaming event produced by WWE. It was held for wrestlers from the promotion's Raw and SmackDown brand divisions. The event took place on August 23, 2020, from the WWE ThunderDome, hosted at the Amway Center in Orlando, Florida. It was WWE's first pay-per-view to be broadcast from the ThunderDome bio-secure bubble. It was also the first SummerSlam since 2011 to not feature Brock Lesnar, who competed in the main event match for the past six years and in 2012. Additionally, it was the first SummerSlam since 2009 to feature MVP. 

The event was originally scheduled to take place at the TD Garden in Boston, Massachusetts, but due to the COVID-19 pandemic, Boston mayor Marty Walsh announced the suspension of all large-scale gatherings and that no permit would be issued for an event that could draw a large crowd before September 7. Since mid-March, WWE had presented the majority of their shows from the WWE Performance Center in Orlando with no fans in attendance due to the pandemic. With the move to the Amway Center, SummerSlam was the first major WWE event held outside of the Performance Center since March, although still without fans physically in attendance; fans were instead able to attend and be seen virtually on LED boards in the venue through the ThunderDome arena staging.

The card comprised eight matches, including one on the Kickoff pre-show. In the main event, which was the main match for SmackDown, "The Fiend" Bray Wyatt defeated Braun Strowman in a Falls Count Anywhere match to win the Universal Championship for a second time. Following the match, Roman Reigns returned following a five-month hiatus and attacked both men, turning heel for the first time since 2014. In the penultimate match, which was the main match for Raw, Drew McIntyre defeated Randy Orton to retain the WWE Championship. In other prominent matches, Mandy Rose defeated Sonya Deville in a No Disqualification Loser Leaves WWE match, and Asuka defeated Sasha Banks to win the Raw Women's Championship for a second time after losing her match against Bayley for the SmackDown Women's Championship in the opening bout. The event was also notable for the in-ring debut of Rey Mysterio's son Dominik Mysterio, who lost to Seth Rollins in a street fight.

Production

Background
SummerSlam is an annual pay-per-view (PPV) and WWE Network event, produced every summer by WWE since 1988. Dubbed "The Biggest Party of the Summer", it is one of the promotion's original four pay-per-views, along with WrestleMania, SummerSlam, and Survivor Series, referred to as the "Big Four". It has since become considered WWE's second biggest event of the year behind WrestleMania. The 2020 event was the 33rd event in the SummerSlam chronology and featured wrestlers from the Raw and SmackDown brand divisions.

Impact of the COVID-19 pandemic

As a result of the COVID-19 pandemic, WWE had to present the majority of its programming for Raw and SmackDown from a behind closed doors set at the WWE Performance Center in Orlando, Florida beginning mid-March, although in late May, the promotion began using Performance Center trainees to serve as the live audience, which was further expanded to friends and family members of the wrestlers in mid-June. SummerSlam, as well as the preceding night's NXT TakeOver event, were originally scheduled to take place in Boston, Massachusetts at the TD Garden. On May 8, the ongoing pandemic forced Boston mayor Marty Walsh to suspend all large-scale gatherings until September 7, effectively canceling WWE's planned events in the city.

Wrestling journalist Dave Meltzer reported that the promotion was open to moving SummerSlam to September if it meant having fans in attendance. However, an advertisement that aired during The Horror Show at Extreme Rules confirmed that SummerSlam would still be taking place on August 23, but with no reference to a city or venue. Although Pro Wrestling Insider had reported that the event would be held at the WWE Performance Center, the promotion put out an official statement on July 23 that the announcement of a new location would be forthcoming. WWE also stated that refunds would be issued at original point of purchase. PWInsider then reported that WWE were looking into hosting SummerSlam on a cruise ship or on a beach.

On August 17, it was made official that SummerSlam would emanate from the Amway Center, a larger venue also located in Orlando. This made SummerSlam the first major WWE event to be held outside of the Performance Center since March. WWE also entered into an agreement with the Amway Center in which all future broadcasts of Raw, SmackDown, and PPVs would be held at the venue "for the foreseeable future." Along with the move, WWE partnered with the full-service fan experience company The Famous Group to provide a "virtual fan experience," a bio-secure bubble dubbed the WWE ThunderDome, which was first utilized for the August 21 episode of SmackDown. Drones, lasers, pyro, smoke, and projections were utilized to make the wrestlers' entrances "better than WrestleMania," according to WWE Executive Vice President of Television Production Kevin Dunn, who further noted that "We can now do things production-wise that we could never otherwise do." They also installed nearly 1,000 LED boards in the Amway Center to allow for rows and rows of virtual fans, who could register for a free virtual seat. Arena audio was also mixed with that of the virtual fans so that chants from the fans could be heard.

Storylines
The event comprised eight matches, including one on the Kickoff pre-show, that resulted from scripted storylines, where wrestlers portrayed heroes, villains, or less distinguishable characters in scripted events that built tension and culminated in a wrestling match or series of matches. Results were predetermined by WWE's writers on the Raw and SmackDown brands, while storylines were produced on WWE's weekly television shows, Monday Night Raw and Friday Night SmackDown.

At Money in the Bank, Braun Strowman retained the Universal Championship against Bray Wyatt, who wrestled as his Firefly Fun House character. After being absent for a few weeks, Wyatt returned on the June 19 episode of SmackDown, but was interrupted by Strowman. Wyatt stated their rivalry was just getting started before appearing as his old cult leader persona of The Wyatt Family, which formerly included Strowman and from where Strowman had originally made his WWE debut. This led to a non-title match between the two called the Wyatt Swamp Fight at The Horror Show at Extreme Rules, where Wyatt, fighting as his old Eater of Worlds self, defeated Strowman, who disappeared somewhere in the swamp. As Wyatt tried to leave himself, he was pulled back into the water, only for his alter ego The Fiend to appear. On the following SmackDown, Wyatt stated that his old Eater of Worlds self was done for now and that The Fiend had been unleashed. The following week, Wyatt said that The Fiend wanted the Universal Championship and that no one was safe until he got it, which was made evident later that night when The Fiend attacked Alexa Bliss, Strowman's old tag team partner from Season 1 of Mixed Match Challenge. On the August 7 episode, The Fiend tried attacking Bliss again, who seemingly showed affection for The Fiend, causing him to back off. Strowman then appeared on the TitanTron, stating he did not care about Bliss and that he emerged a monster from the swamp. Strowman then accepted The Fiend's challenge for the Universal Championship at SummerSlam. The following week saw Strowman attacking Bliss to lure out The Fiend, who appeared in the ring to confront Strowman. On the August 22 episode of Talking Smack, the stipulation was changed to a Falls Count Anywhere match.

On the July 27 episode of Raw, Randy Orton cut a promo listing many of his accolades before declaring that he wanted the WWE Championship again. He then issued a challenge to champion Drew McIntyre for a title match at SummerSlam. Later that night, McIntyre accepted Orton's challenge and then defeated Dolph Ziggler in an Extreme Rules match in a rematch from The Horror Show at Extreme Rules, preventing Ziggler from earning the title opportunity. Following the match, Orton attacked McIntyre with an RKO.

After United States Champion Apollo Crews repeatedly declined MVP's offer to join his faction, later dubbed The Hurt Business, the two faced each other in a non-title match on the June 29 episode of Raw that was won by MVP. After the match, Crews was brutally attacked by MVP's teammate Bobby Lashley. The following week, MVP unveiled a new United States Championship belt and stated that he would face Crews for the title at The Horror Show at Extreme Rules. At the event, however, Crews was unable to compete due to failing his pre-match physical thanks to Lashley's attack. MVP then declared himself winner by forfeit and unofficially claimed himself as the new United States Champion. Crews, sporting the older United States title belt, returned on the August 3 episode of Raw where he formally faced MVP in a title match where Crews retained. Celebrating his victory, Crews later stated in a backstage interview that he would give the old belt to his children while he kept the new belt MVP introduced. MVP then demanded a rematch for SummerSlam and Crews accepted. On the August 17 episode, Crews defeated Hurt Business' Shelton Benjamin, thus banning Benjamin and Lashley from ringside during the title match at SummerSlam, which was set to occur on the Kickoff pre-show.

Following several weeks of Seth Rollins tormenting and taunting Rey Mysterio, the two finally faced each other at The Horror Show at Extreme Rules in an Eye for an Eye match in which one opponent had to extract an eye of the other to win the match, which was won by Rollins. Mysterio's son Dominik appeared on the July 27 episode of Raw to confront Rollins and his disciple Murphy for Rollins' actions, as well as for Rollins gloating about it. Although Dominik attacked Rollins and Murphy, they eventually overpowered Dominik until Aleister Black came out to Dominik's aid. The brawl, however, resulted in Murphy injuring Black's eye using the corner of the steel steps. The following week, Dominik challenged Rollins to a match at SummerSlam. Later, after Rollins and Murphy taunted commentator Tom Phillips (which led to fellow commentator Samoa Joe defending Phillips), they were both attacked from behind by Dominik with a kendo stick. Rollins then accepted Dominik's challenge. During the contract signing the following week, in which Dominik also signed a contract to officially become a WWE wrestler, Rollins stated that Dominik could use any kind of weapon he wanted. After Rollins defeated Humberto Carrillo, Rollins and Murphy attacked Dominik with kendo sticks. Their SummerSlam match was later made a Street Fight.

At The Horror Show at Extreme Rules, the Raw Women's Championship match between Sasha Banks and defending champion Asuka ended in controversy when Asuka inadvertently spat green mist in the referee's face, which led to Bayley removing the referee's shirt and counting the pin for Banks to unofficially win the title. The following night on Raw, WWE Chief Brand Officer Stephanie McMahon stated that neither Banks or Asuka won at Extreme Rules and announced a rematch between the two for the following week in a match where the title could be won by pinfall, submission, disqualification, or count out. During the ensuing match, Bayley attacked Asuka's tag team partner Kairi Sane backstage. Asuka then left the match to check on Sane, resulting in her losing by count-out, thus Banks won the title for a record fifth time. On the August 3 episode, Asuka demanded a rematch for the title, however, Banks stated that she had to defeat Bayley to earn the match at SummerSlam, which Asuka did the following week. On that Friday's SmackDown, as Bayley did not have a challenger for her SmackDown Women's Championship at SummerSlam, Stephanie announced a triple brand battle royal for the following week, featuring wrestlers from Raw, SmackDown, and NXT, with the winner facing Bayley at the event. Surprise entrant Asuka won the battle royal, thus double booking Asuka to face the WWE Women's Tag Team Champions in singles matches for their respective singles titles. On the August 21 episode of SmackDown, both Banks and Bayley faced Naomi in a Beat the Clock challenge to determine the order of their respective title defenses against Asuka with the loser defending first; Banks subsequently won as she defeated Naomi, who in turn defeated Bayley.

At the onset of 2020, a romance began between Mandy Rose and Heavy Machinery's Otis. They were set to have a Valentine's Day date, however, Dolph Ziggler arrived first, stealing the date with Rose. Prior to WrestleMania 36, it was revealed that Rose's Fire and Desire tag team partner Sonya Deville had conspired with Ziggler to sabotage the date by sending a fake text to Otis that Rose was running late. Otis then defeated Ziggler at the event with the help of Rose, who also attacked Deville. Rose then entered into a months long feud with Deville, who claimed that Rose was all looks and no talent. This culminated on the July 31 episode of SmackDown where Deville attacked Rose backstage and cut some of her hair off. Rose, now sporting shorter hair, then challenged Deville to a Hair vs. Hair match at SummerSlam, which Deville accepted. The following week, Rose had a change of heart, thinking there was still some good in Deville, and asked to put their rivalry behind them. Deville instead raised the stakes and changed the stipulation of their match to a no disqualification match where the loser leaves WWE. This stipulation change was brought about due to a real life incident involving Deville; her home had been broken into by a stalker in Florida. Her lawyers cited it was not a good idea to have a shaved head while in court.

On the July 27 episode of Raw, Angel Garza and Andrade defeated The Viking Raiders (Erik and Ivar) and Ricochet and Cedric Alexander in a triple threat tag team match to become the number one contenders for The Street Profits' (Angelo Dawkins and Montez Ford) Raw Tag Team Championship at SummerSlam.

Event

Pre-show
During the SummerSlam Kickoff pre-show, Apollo Crews defended the United States Championship against MVP with MVP's stablemates Bobby Lashley and Shelton Benjamin banned from ringside. In the end, Crews performed a Toss Powerbomb on MVP to retain the title. Following the match, Benjamin and Lashley came down to the ring to attack Crews, however, Crews escaped.

Preliminary matches
The actual pay-per-view opened with Bayley (accompanied by Sasha Banks) defending the SmackDown Women's Championship against Asuka. In the end, Asuka attempted to attack Bayley, who was teetering on the ring ropes, however, Bayley moved out of the way and Asuka inadvertently knocked off Banks, who had been standing on the ring apron to try and distract Asuka. Bayley then performed a roll-up on Asuka to retain the title. Following the match, Bayley and Banks attacked Asuka.

Next, The Street Profits (Angelo Dawkins and Montez Ford) defended the Raw Tag Team Championship against Andrade and Angel Garza (accompanied by Zelina Vega). The climax saw Vega stand on the ring apron to distract the referee. Garza performed a Superkick on Dawkins, who bumped into Vega knocking her off the ring apron. Dawkins then performed a Powerbomb on Garza and Ford performed From the Heavens on Garza to retain the titles.

After that, Mandy Rose faced Sonya Deville in a no disqualification match where the loser would leave WWE. During the first half of the match, Rose and Deville fought at ringside, where Rose performed a flying Lariat on Deville off the announce table. Deville attacked Rose with a chair and slammed her head on the announce table. Rose performed three Running Knees, a Fairytale Ending, and a fourth Running Knee on Deville to win the match. Following the match, Otis came out to celebrate with Rose where Rose performed her own rendition of The Caterpillar, Otis's finisher.

In the next match, Seth Rollins (accompanied by Murphy) fought Dominik Mysterio (accompanied by his father, Rey Mysterio) in a Street Fight. This was Dominik's first match as a WWE wrestler. Dominik performed a Russian Legsweep on Rollins from the top turnbuckle onto table below. Later on, Rey Mysterio tried to interfere but Dominik told him not to do so. Later on, Rollins handcuffed Rey to the second rope. In the end, Rollins performed The Stomp on Dominik to win the match. 

Next, Sasha Banks (accompanied by Bayley) defended the Raw Women's Championship against Asuka. During the match, Banks performed a Powerbomb from the ring apron on Asuka. Asuka applied an Ankle Lock on Banks, who rolled through. Asuka countered a Superplex attempt into a DDT on Banks for a nearfall. Asuka performed a Missile Dropkick from the top rope on Banks for a nearfall. Banks attempted a Frog Splash, but Asuka moved out of the way. Asuka then applied the Asuka Lock on Banks, who countered into a pinning combination for a nearfall, after which, Banks applied the Bank Statement. As Banks brought Asuka to the middle of the ring, Asuka countered into the Asuka Lock, but Banks escaped. The end saw a similar situation from the event's SmackDown Women's Championship match occur, with the roles of Banks and Bayley switched, however, Bayley moved out of the way. Asuka then attacked Bayley, but as Banks attempted the Bank Statement, Asuka reversed into the Asuka Lock to force Banks to submit, thus winning the title for a second time.

In the penultimate match, Drew McIntyre defended the WWE Championship against Randy Orton. In the climax, after a back-and-forth contest, Orton attempted a Punt Kick on McIntyre, however, McIntyre countered with a powerbomb. As McIntyre attempted a Claymore Kick on Orton, Orton avoided it, however, McIntyre performed a backslide pin on Orton to retain the title.

Main event
In the main event, Braun Strowman defended the Universal Championship against "The Fiend" Bray Wyatt in a Falls Count Anywhere match. During the match, the two fought up the entrance ramp and inside the gorilla position. In the closing moments, Strowman used a box cutter to cut the top ring canvas to expose the wooden flooring. The Fiend countered an attack from Strowman and performed a Uranage and two consecutive Sister Abigails on Strowman onto the exposed wood to regain the title for a second time. After the match, a returning Roman Reigns (in his first appearance in five months) appeared and performed a Spear on The Fiend. Reigns then performed a Spear on Strowman, who was staggering at ringside, and attacking him with multiple chair shots. Reigns then returned to the ring to execute another Spear on The Fiend before hoisting up the Universal Championship.

Aftermath

Raw
The following night on Raw, WWE Champion Drew McIntyre gloated how he had defeated "the greatest wrestler ever" with a wrestling move, and stated that he knew that Randy Orton wanted a rematch. As McIntyre made his exit, Orton attacked McIntyre and delivered two Punts to him. Later, McIntyre attacked Orton during Orton's match against the debuting Keith Lee and the brawl ended with Orton delivering a third Punt to McIntyre, taking him out for the next couple of weeks. On the August 31 episode, Orton earned himself another title opportunity against McIntyre for the WWE Championship at Clash of Champions.

Sasha Banks challenged Asuka to a rematch for the Raw Women's Championship, but as a lumberjack match. However, Banks was unsuccessful in regaining the title, thus ending their feud. However, the two faced each other again at Survivor Series on November 22, but as a champion vs. champion match with Banks as SmackDown Women's Champion, where Banks was victorious.

Dominik Mysterio teamed with his father Rey Mysterio in a tag team match against Seth Rollins and Murphy, but the match ended in a disqualification after Retribution attacked the Mysterios. On August 28, a rematch was scheduled for Payback.

Also on the following Raw, United States Champion Apollo Crews was scheduled to defend his title against The Hurt Business' Bobby Lashley at Payback. The two also had an arm wrestling match that Crews won when he took a cheap shot by stomping on Lashley's foot.

SmackDown
The day after SummerSlam, it was announced that new Universal Champion "The Fiend" Bray Wyatt would defend the title against Braun Strowman and Roman Reigns in a no holds barred triple threat match at Payback. Subsequently on SmackDown, it was revealed that Reigns aligned himself with Paul Heyman.

Results

Notes

References

External links
 

2020
2020 WWE Network events
2020 WWE pay-per-view events
2020 in professional wrestling in Florida
Professional wrestling in Orlando, Florida
Events in Orlando, Florida
August 2020 events in the United States
Impact of the COVID-19 pandemic on television